Below is the list of populated places in Diyarbakır Province, Turkey by the districts. The first four districts (Bağlar, Kayapınar, Sur and Yenişehir) are parts of the city of Greater Diyarbakır. In the following lists, the first place in each district list is the administrative center of that district.

Bağlar

 Bağlar
 Buyuransu
 Ekince
 Kamışpınar
 Karacadağ
 Karahanköy
 Kırkkoyun
 Oğlaklı
 Ortaören
 Övündüler
 Sakallı
 Yalankoz
 Yiğityolu
 Yukarıakdibek

Kayapınar

 Kayapınar
 Avcısuyu
 Baykara
 Cumhuriyet
 Devedurağı
 Esentepe
 Güleçoba
 Harmanardı
 Hatipoğlu
 Kaldırımköy
 Karayakup
 Keklik
 Kırkpınar
 Petek
 Sağkulak
 Sultantepe
 Taban
 Tavukçu
 Tosunlu
 Yeniözerli

Sur

 Sur
 Ağaçlıdere
 Alabal
 Alcık
 Alibardak
 Arpaderesi
 Baroğlu
 Beybulak
 Bostanpınar
 Büyükakören
 Çataksu
 Çelikli
 Çubuklu
 Dervişhasan
 Doğanlı
 Dumrul
 Eryolu
 Fidanlar
 Gültepe
 Harmanlar
 Kapaklıpınar
 Karacaören
 Karaçimen
 Karpuztepe
 Kartaltepe
 Kavaklıbağ
 Kayayolu
 Kengerli
 Konacık
 Koyungüden
 Kumluçat
 Kumrucak
 Küçükakören
 Mermer
 Mermeri
 Nefirtaş
 Özekli
 Sağdıçlı
 Sapanca
 Sarılar
 Sarıyazma
 Sayarlar
 Soğanlı
 Tezgeçer
 Yarımca
 Yenice
 Yenidoğan
 Yenievler
 Ziyaret

Yenişehir

 Yenişehir
 Al
 Alangör
 Bozek
 Çakmak
 Dikentepe
 Ekinciler
 Geyiktepe
 Hantepe
 Sarıyatak
 Sivritepe
 Yaytaş

Bismil

 Bismil
 Ağılköy
 Ağıllı
 Ahmetli
 Akbaş
 Akçay
 Akköy
 Akoba
 Alıncak
 Alibey
 Aluç
 Ambar
 Aralık
 Arıkgöl
 Aslanoğlu
 Aşağıdolay
 Aşağıoba
 Ataköy
 Aygeçti
 Babahaki
 Bademli
 Baharlı
 Bahçe
 Bakacak
 Balcılar
 Başhan
 Başköy
 Başören
 Bayındır
 Belli
 Boyacı
 Bozçalı
 Bölümlü
 Çakallı
 Çakıllı
 Çatalköy
 Çavuşlu
 Çeltikli
 Çölağan
 Çöltepe
 Derbent
 Diktepe
 Doruk
 Eliaçık
 Erler
 Gedikbaşı
 Göksu
 Gültepe
 Güngeçti
 Güroluk
 Güzelköy
 Harmanlı
 Hasanpınar
 Işıklar
 İsalı
 İsapınar
 Kağıtlı
 Kamberli
 Kamışlı
 Karabörk
 Karacık
 Karaçölya
 Karagöz
 Karapınar
 Karatepe
 Karayiğit
 Kavuşak
 Kayıköy
 Kazancı
 Keberli
 Kılavuztepe
 Kocalar
 Koğuk
 Kopmaz
 Kopuzlu
 Korukçu
 Koyunlu
 Köprüköy
 Köseli
 Kumrulu
 Kurudeğirmen
 Kurudere
 Merdan
 Meydanlık
 Mirzabey
 Obalı
 Ofköy
 Oğuzlar
 Pınarbaşı
 Sarıköy
 Sarıtoprak
 Sazlı
 Seki
 Serçeler
 Sinanköy
 Şahintepe
 Tatlıçayır
 Tepe
 Tepecik
 Tilkilik
 Topraklı
 Türkmenhacı
 Uğrak
 Uğurlu
 Ulutürk
 Uyanık
 Üçtepe
 Yağmurköy
 Yamaçköy
 Yasince
 Yenice
 Yukarıdolay
 Yukarısalat
 Yukarıharım

Çermik

 Çermik
 Ağaçhan
 Akçörten
 Akkoyunlu
 Akpınar
 Alabuğday
 Alakoç
 Arabük
 Armağantaşı
 Armutlu
 Artuk
 Asmalık
 Aşağışeyhler
 Aşağıtaşmalı
 Aynalı
 Bademlik
 Bahçe
 Balıksırtı
 Başarı
 Bayat
 Bayırbağı
 Baykal
 Bayrak
 Bintaş
 Bircemal
 Bulundu
 Ceylan
 Çalıtepe
 Çukurelma
 Değirmenli
 Dikyol
 Dilekpınar
 Elifuşağı
 Eskibağ
 Genceli
 Göktepe
 Gözerek
 Güçlütaş
 Günaşan
 Gürüz
 Güzel
 İkiçeltik
 İncili
 Kalaç
 Kalecik
 Karacaviran
 Karakaya
 Karakolan
 Karamusa
 Karataş
 Kartaltaşı
 Kayagediği
 Keklik
 Kırmatepe
 Konaklı
 Konuksever
 Korudağ
 Köksal
 Kömürcüler
 Kuşlukçayırı
 Kuyuköy
 Örenkuyu
 Pamuklu
 Petekkaya
 Pınarlı
 Recep
 Saltepe
 Sarıbalta
 Sarıca
 Sinekköy
 Şeyhandede
 Toplu
 Yabanardı
 Yayıklı
 Yaylacık
 Yeşilova
 Yiğitler
 Yoğun

Çınar

 Çınar
 Ağaçsever
 Akçomak
 Aktepe
 Alabaş
 Alancık
 Altınakar
 Arafat
 Aşağıkonak
 Aşağımollaali
 Avdalı
 Ayveri
 Bağacık
 Ballıbaba
 Başaklı
 Başalan
 Bayırkonağı
 Belenli
 Bellitaş
 Beneklitaş
 Beşpınar
 Bilmece
 Biramehmetağa
 Boğazören
 Bozçalı
 Bulutçeker
 Buyuransu
 Çakırkaya
 Çakırtutmaz
 Çataltarla
 Çeltikaltı
 Çınarköy
 Çömçeli
 Çukurbaşı
 Demirölçek
 Dikmencik
 Dişlibaşak
 Düzova
 Ekinveren
 Filizören
 Göktepe
 Görece
 Gümüştaş
 Gürses
 Halıören
 Halkapınar
 Harabe
 Hasköy
 Höyükdibi
 İnanöz
 İncirtepe
 Karababa
 Karabudak
 Karaçevre
 Karalar
 Karasungur
 Kazıktepe
 Kılıçkaya
 Kırkağaç
 Köksalan
 Kubacık
 Kuruyazı
 Kutluk
 Kuyuluhöyük
 Kürekli
 Leblebitaş
 Meydanköy
 Muratcık
 Ortaşar
 Ovabağ
 Öncülü
 Özgider
 Özyar
 Pembeviran
 Piremehmetağa
 Salyazı
 Sevindik
 Sırımkesen
 Soğansuyu
 Solmaz
 Sürendal
 Şekerören
 Şeyhçoban
 Şükürlü
 Taşhelvası
 Tekkaynak
 Tilver
 Toraman
 Uzgider
 Yaprakbaşı
 Yarımkaş
 Yazçiçeği
 Yeşilbağ
 Yeşiltaş
 Yıllarca
 Yukarıortaören
 Yuvacık

Çüngüş

 Çüngüş
 Akbaşak
 Aktaş
 Albayrak
 Arpadere
 Atalar
 Avut
 Aydınlı
 Balcılar
 Çataldut
 Çaybaşı
 Çınarköy
 Değirmensuyu
 Deveboynu
 Elmadere
 Geçitköy
 Gökçepelit
 Güneydere
 Handere
 Hindibaba
 İbikkaya
 Karakaya
 Kaynakköy
 Keleşevleri
 Koçören
 Külbastı
 Malkaya
 Ormançayı
 Oyuklu
 Polatuşağı
 Sağtepe
 Seferuşağı
 Türkmen
 Üçpınar
 Yaygınkonak
 Yazyağmuru
 Yenice
 Yeniköy
 Yukarışeyhler

Dicle

 Dicle
 Acar
 Altayköy
 Arıköy
 Bademli
 Bahçedere
 Bahçeköy
 Baltacı
 Başköy
 Baturköy
 Biçer
 Boğaz
 Boğazköy
 Bozaba
 Çavlı
 Dedeköy
 Değirmenli
 Döğer
 Durabeyli
 Gelincik
 Gölbaşı
 Gündoğdu
 Kaygısız
 Kayıköy
 Kelekçi
 Kırkpınar
 Kocaalan
 Koruköy
 Kurşunlu
 Kurudere
 Meydanköy
 Pekmezciler
 Pınar
 Sergenli
 Taşağıl
 Tepe
 Tepebaşı
 Uğrak
 Ulubaş
 Uluçeşme
 Üzümlü
 Yeşilsırt
 Yokuşlu

Eğil

 Eğil
 Akalan
 Aşağıdöşemeler
 Babalar
 Bahşılar
 Balaban
 Balım
 Baysu
 Döşemeler
 Düzlük
 Gürünlü
 Ilgın
 Kalecik
 Kalkan
 Kayaköyü
 Kazanlı
 Kırkkuyu
 Konak
 Meşeler
 Oyalı
 Sağlam
 Sarıca
 Sarmaşık
 Selmanköy
 Taşdam
 Tepecik
 Yatır
 Yukarıhaydan

Ergani

 Ergani
 Ahmetli
 Akçakale
 Akçoban
 Alitaşı
 Armutova
 Aşağıbitikçi
 Aşağıkuyulu
 Azıklı
 Bademli
 Bahçekaşı
 Bereketli
 Boğazköy
 Boncuklu
 Bozyer
 Caferan
 Canveren
 Coşkun
 Çakartaş
 Çakırfakır
 Çayırdere
 Çayköy
 Çimlihöyük
 Çukurdere
 Dağarası
 Dallıdağ
 Değirmendere
 Demirli
 Dereboyu
 Deringöze
 Develi
 Devletkuşu
 Dibektaş
 Doğanköy
 Giraylar
 Gökiçi
 Gözekaya
 Gözlü
 Gülerce
 Güneştepe
 Güzelyurt
 Hançerli
 Hendekköy
 İncehıdır
 Karaburçak
 Karpuzlu
 Karşıbağlar
 Kavaklı
 Kavurmaküpü
 Kayan
 Kesentaş
 Kıralan
 Kocaali
 Kortaş
 Koyunalan
 Kömürtaş
 Kumçi
 Morkoyun
 Olgun
 Ortaağaç
 Ortayazı
 Otluca
 Özbilek
 Pınarkaya
 Sabırlı
 Salihli
 Sallar
 Sallıca
 Savaş
 Selmanköy
 Sesverenpınar
 Sökündüzü
 Şölen
 Tevekli
 Usluca
 Üçkardeş
 Üzümlü
 Yakacık
 Yamaçlar
 Yapraklı
 Yayvantepe
 Yeniköy
 Yeşilköy
 Yolbulan
 Yolköprü
 Yoncalı
 Yukarıbitikçi
 Yukarıkarpuzlu
 Yukarıkuyulu
 Ziyaret

Hani

 Hani
 Abacılar
 Akçayurt
 Anıl
 Belen
 Çardaklı
 Çukurköy
 Gömeç
 Gürbüz
 Kalaba
 Kaledibi
 Kırım
 Kuyular
 Okurköy
 Serenköy
 Sergen
 Soylu
 Süslü
 Topçular
 Uzunlar
 Yayvan
 Yukarıturalı

Hazro

 Hazro
 Ağartı
 Bağyurdu
 Bayırdüzü
 Çitlibahçe
 Dadaş
 Gedikalan
 Gözlü
 Gürlek
 İncekavak
 Kavaklıboğaz
 Kırkkaşık
 Kırmataş
 Koçbaba
 Kulaçtepe
 Meşebağları
 Mutluca
 Ormankaya
 Sarıçanak
 Sarıerik
 Terdöken
 Uzunargıt
 Ülgen
 Varınca
 Yazgı

Kocaköy

 Kocaköy
 Anbar
 Arkbaşı
 Boyunlu
 Bozbağlar
 Bozyar
 Çaytepe
 Gökçen
 Gözebaşı
 Günalan
 Suçıktı
 Şaklat
 Tepecik
 Yazıköy

Kulp

 Kulp
 Ağaçkorur
 Ağaçlı
 Ağıllı
 Akbulak
 Akçasır
 Akdoruk
 Alaca
 Argunköy
 Aşağıelmalı
 Aygün
 Ayhanköy
 Bağcılar
 Baloğlu
 Barın
 Başbuğ
 Bayırköy
 Çağlayan
 Çukurca
 Demirli
 Dolun
 Düzce
 Elmalı
 Güleç
 Güllük
 Hamzalı
 İnkaya
 İslamköy
 Kamışlı
 Karaağaç
 Karabulak
 Karaorman
 Karpuzlu
 Kayacık
 Kayahan
 Koçkar
 Konuklu
 Kurudere
 Narlıca
 Özbek
 Salkımlı
 Saltukköy
 Taşköprü
 Temren
 Tuzlaköy
 Uygur
 Uzunova
 Üçkuyu
 Ünal
 Yakıtköy
 Yayıkköy
 Yaylak
 Yuvacık
 Zeyrek

Lice

 Lice
 Abalı
 Akçabudak
 Arıklı
 Bağlan
 Baharlar
 Bayırlı
 Birlik
 Budak
 Çağdaş
 Çavundur
 Çeper
 Çıralı
 Dallıca
 Damar
 Daralan
 Dernek
 Dibekköy
 Dolunay
 Duruköy
 Ecemiş
 Erginköy
 Esenler
 Gökçe
 Güçlü
 Güldiken
 Gürbeyli
 Hedik
 Kabakaya
 Kılıçlı
 Kıpçak
 Kıralan
 Kıyıköy
 Kutlu
 Ortaç
 Oyuklu
 Örtülü
 Savat
 Saydamlı
 Serince
 Sığınak
 Şenlik
 Tepe
 Tuzlaköy
 Türeli
 Uçarlı
 Ulucak
 Üçdamlar
 Yalaza
 Yalımlı
 Yamaçlı
 Yaprakköy
 Yolçatı
 Yorulmaz
 Yünlüce
 Ziyaret
 Zümrüt

Silvan

 Silvan
 Akçayır
 Akçeltik
 Akdere
 Akyol
 Alibey
 Altınkum
 Arıköy
 Aşağıkaya
 Aşağıveysi
 Babakaya
 Bağdere
 Bahçe
 Başdeğirmen
 Başıbüyük
 Bayrambaşı
 Bellibahçe
 Bereketli
 Beypınar
 Boyunlu
 Çakıltaşı
 Çaldere
 Çardakköy
 Çatakköprü
 Çevriksu
 Çiftliçevre
 Çiğdemli
 Çiğil
 Çobantepe
 Dağcılar
 Darköprü
 Demirkuyu
 Dolaplıdere
 Doluçanak
 Duru
 Düzalan
 Erikyazı
 Eskiköy
 Eskiocak
 Eşme
 Gökçetevek
 Görentepe
 Görmez
 Güçlü
 Gündüzköy
 Gürpınar
 Güzderesi
 Heybelikonuk
 İncesu
 Karacalar
 Karahacı
 Karamus
 Kasımlı
 Kayadere
 Kazandağı
 Keklikdere
 Kıraçtepe
 Kızlar
 Kumgölü
 Kumluk
 Kutlualan
 Nohuttepe
 Onbaşılar
 Ormandışı
 Otluk
 Sağlık
 Şanlı
 Sarıbuğday
 Sulak
 Sulubağ
 Susuz
 Taşpınar
 Tokluca
 Umurköy
 Üçbasamak
 Yenidoğan
 Yeniköy
 Yeşerdi
 Yeşilbahçe
 Yeşilköy
 Yolaç
 Yolarası
 Yukarıveysi
 Yuvaköy

References

List
Diyarbakır
Southeastern Anatolia Region